Simon Beresford-Wylie (born 18 May 1958) is the CEO of Imagination Technologies, a UK-based supplier of semiconductor intellectual property.  Prior to joining Imagination in October 2020, Beresford-Wylie was the CEO of Arqiva, a UK leader in the provision of communications, broadcast and media services.   Prior to joining Arqiva in 2015, he was Global Executive Advisor and Executive Vice President to the networks business unit of Samsung Electronics.  He was the former president and CEO of Nokia Siemens Networks, and a member of the group executive board of Nokia Corporation from February 2005 to October 2009. He was a member of the board of directors of the Vitec Group from 1 March 2006 until 30 November 2013.

Beresford-Wylie is a dual UK-Australian citizen. He is married to Margaret and has two children, Edward and Guy.

Career
Beresford-Wylie worked for Australian government agencies responsible for taxation and industry policy from 1982 until 1989, before entering the private sector.

Since 1989, Beresford-Wylie held various management positions within Australia's Telstra Corporation's Corporate and Government Business Unit. In 1995, he became the chief executive officer of an Indian mobile operator Modi Telstra (a joint venture between Telstra Corporation and ModiCorp of India).

Beresford-Wylie joined Nokia in 1998. He held several positions in Nokia in Asia and Europe before becoming the head of Nokia's infrastructure business group in February 2005. He was the Executive Vice President and General Manager for Nokia Networks, before becoming chief executive officer of Nokia Siemens Networks in 2007.

Beresford-Wylie left his position as CEO of Nokia Siemens Networks on 30 September 2009. He was succeeded by Rajeev Suri.

On 4 November 2009, Beresford-Wylie became the CEO of Elster Group, a provider of smart metering and smart grid systems to the gas, electricity and water industries.  Elster Group was acquired by Melrose PLC in August 2012.

Beresford-Wylie was Chief Executive of Digital Mobile Spectrum Limited (DMSL), also known as at800, from 14 January 2013 until 30 November 2013.  DMSL, a UK-based Company, has responsibility for mitigating potential interference issues arising from the coexistence of digital terrestrial television (DTT) and 4G mobile services in the 800 MHz band.

On 1 December 2013, Beresford-Wylie was appointed Global Executive Advisor (EVP) to the Networks Business of Samsung Electronics.  He is based in Suwon, Korea.

On 22 June 2015 UK broadcasting and communications infrastructure and services provider Arqiva named Simon Beresford-Wylie as its new CEO, replacing John Cresswell.

On 5 October 2020 Imagination Technologies named Simon Beresford-Wylie as its new CEO, replacing acting CEO Ray Bingham (who is also Imagination's Executive Chairman)

Education
Simon holds a bachelor's degree in history and geography from the Australian National University. He is a graduate of the Executive Development Program of Stanford University/National University of Singapore.

References

1958 births
Living people
British businesspeople
Australian chief executives
Nokia people